Ana Carolina Vidal is a Brazilian mixed martial artist who competes in the Flyweight division of Invicta. She is also won the World Nogi Brazilian Jiu-Jitsu Championship twice.

Mixed martial arts record

|-
| Loss
| align=center| 0–1
| Aspen Ladd
| TKO (elbows)
| Invicta FC 11: Cyborg vs. Tweet
| 
| align=center| 1
| align=center| 4:21
| Los Angeles, California
| 
|-

References

External links
 Ana Carolina Vidal at Awakening Fighters

Brazilian female mixed martial artists
Living people
Flyweight mixed martial artists
Mixed martial artists utilizing Brazilian jiu-jitsu
Brazilian practitioners of Brazilian jiu-jitsu
People awarded a black belt in Brazilian jiu-jitsu
Female Brazilian jiu-jitsu practitioners
Sportspeople from Rio de Janeiro (city)
Year of birth missing (living people)